The 2017–18 season was the 115th in the history of the Southern League since its establishment in 1894. It was also the last to have a single Premier Division. From the 2014–15 season onwards, the Southern League is known as Evo-Stik League Southern, following a sponsorship deal with Evo-Stik. 

The league constitution was announced in May 2017.

Premier Division

At the end of the season a new division was to be created at step 3. Also, the number of clubs in step 3 divisions was reduced from 24 to 22. To make up the number of clubs at step 3 only one Premier Division club was to be relegated this season.

The Premier Division consisted of 24 clubs, including 18 clubs from the previous season, and six new clubs:
Two clubs promoted from Division One Central:
Farnborough
Royston Town

Two clubs promoted from Division One South & West:
Hereford
Tiverton Town

Two clubs relegated from the National League South:
Bishop's Stortford
Gosport Borough

League table

Results table

Play-offs

Semi-finals

Final

Stadia and locations

Division One East

For this season, Division One Central was renamed Division One East.

At the end of the season a new division was to be created at step 3. To make up the number of clubs at step 3 two clubs from each step 4 division, one club with best points-per-game among the step 4 division clubs and six play-off winners were to be promoted this season. Also, a new division were to be added at step 4 within the Isthmian League, while the number of clubs in every step 4 division was decreased to 20. To make up the number of clubs only one club was to be relegated.

Division One East consisted of 22 clubs, including 16 clubs from the previous season Division One Central, and six new clubs:
AFC Rushden & Diamonds, transferred from the Northern Premier League Division One South
Cambridge City, relegated from the Premier Division
Hartley Wintney, promoted from the Combined Counties League
Hayes & Yeading United, relegated from the Premier Division
Moneyfields, promoted from the Wessex League
Thame United, promoted from the Hellenic League

For 2018–19, Division One East was renamed Division One Central.

League table

Results table

Play-offs

Semi-finals

Final

Stadia and locations

Division One West

For this season, Division One South & West was renamed Division One West.

At the end of the season a new division was to be created at step 3. To make up the number of clubs at step 3 two clubs from each step 4 division, one club with best points-per-game among the step 4 division clubs and six play-off winners were to be promoted this season. Also, a new division were to be added at step 4 within the Isthmian League, while the number of clubs in every step 4 division was decreased to 20. To make up the number of clubs only one club was to be relegated.

Division One West featured four new clubs:
Bristol Manor Farm, promoted from the Western League
Cinderford Town, relegated from the Premier Division
Cirencester Town, relegated from the Premier Division
Kidlington, transferred from Division One Central

For 2018–19, Division One West was renamed Division One South.

League table

Results table

Play-offs

Semi-finals

Final

Stadia and locations

League Cup

The 2017–18 Southern League Cup (billed as The BigFreeBet.com Challenge Cup) was the 80th edition of the Southern League Cup, the cup competition of the Southern Football League.

Hereford, Mangotsfield United, and North Leigh declined to participate. The defending champions, Hayes & Yeading United, were defeated in the semi-finals by Hitchin Town.

Preliminary round

First round

Second round

Third round

Quarter-finals

Semi-finals

Final

See also
Southern Football League
2017–18 Isthmian League
2017–18 Northern Premier League

References

External links
Official website

Southern Football League seasons
7